Sven Lagerbring (originally Sven Bring; after being knighted, he wrote his name as Sven Lager Bring; 24 February 1707 – 5 December 1787) was a Swedish professor and historian. He has been described as "the first Swedish historian in the modern sense."

Biography 
Sven Bring was born in Klinta, Bosjökloster, Scania, Sweden. He was the son of vicar  and Abela Olufsdotter Klinthea. He began his studies in 1720 at Lund University, where he became assistant professor of law in 1731, then spent a few years in Stockholm as a teacher for the von Fersen family, during which time he had the opportunity to conduct research in the National Archives. In 1741 he became a registrar in Lund and in 1742 professor of history there, succeeding Kilian Stobæus. In 1751 Lagerbring became juris doctor, in 1755 a member of Queen Louisa Ulrika's Academy of Letters, History and Antiquities, and in 1770 permanently on leave from his professorship for scientific work. Lagerbring was the rector of Lund University in 1748, 1755, and 1769. His influences at the university included professors , Kilian Stobæus, and G. Papke.

Via law, Lagerbring had been moved towards historical research. His law teacher had been the meticulous and source-critical , which influenced his approach to history. During his time as a private instructor for Axel von Fersen the Elder, the later leader of the Hat Party, the formation of the Hats was in full swing and the increasing party struggles between the two parties at the time also influenced his writing. During his first professorship, his works covered a wide range of subjects, including history and its auxiliary sciences, as well as theology, philosophy and more. Lagerbring also published a large number of local history studies from Scania. A similar source publication was also Lagerbring's  (three volumes, 1749–1758). Lagerbring also worked on the history of education and planned a large work, of which, however, only a portion dealing with antiquity was printed in 1748.

Alongside Olof von Dalin, Lagerbring initiated the more modern, critical research in Swedish history, and he undoubtedly ranks higher than Dalin in this respect.

Unlike Dalin, Lagerbring drew a sharp distinction between source and literature, and emphasized, among other things, the higher source value of contemporary sources. As evidence of his critical ability, he raised doubts about the authenticity of the papal bull of Pope Agapetus II, and was also on the trail of the Hamburg-Bremen Church's document forgeries. Lagerbring's main teacher was the Danish historian Hans Gram. Like Langebek, he became skilled at tracking down and gaining access to material held in private collections. Due to his style being less nationalistic and having less of a causerie tone, Lagerbring's work did not receive the appreciation it deserved at the time and in the near future. Only later did Lagerbring's contributions come to be appreciated on their merits.

The university libraries in Lund and Uppsala and the diocesan library in Linköping hold several unpublished manuscripts by Lagerbring, such as lecture outlines, transcripts of deeds and more.

Lagerbring has certainly not been surpassed by any previous Swedish historian in critically astute scholarship; in many places he has set out guidelines which the scholarly work of a later period has followed. His style differs markedly from that of the Enlightenment. It is characterized by a peculiar humor, with incisive, meaningful turns of phrase, not infrequently with a certain archaic touch.

He was the head of the Royal Physiographic Society in Lund in 1778–1779.

As a professor, Lagerbring was highly respected; as inspektor of the Blekingska Nation, he exerted a patriarchal, benevolent influence among the students. On 20 March 1786 Lagerbring became a member of the Royal Swedish Academy of History and Antiquities. He died in Lund in 1787 and is buried in a chapel in Mörarp Church.

Family 
Lagerbring married Maria Beata Lagercreutz in 1745; the couple had six children, four of whom died during his lifetime. His son  (1751–1822) was a count and government official.

Memorials and legacy 
A bust of Lagerbring, made by the artist , has stood on the University Square in Lund since 1907. The day of Lagerbring's death, 5 December, has carried the name Sven in The Swedish Almanac since 1901, in his honor.

References

Further reading 

 
 
 
 
 

Swedish scholars and academics
1787 deaths
Rectors of Lund University
18th-century Swedish historians
18th-century Swedish nobility
Members of the Royal Swedish Academy of Letters, History and Antiquities
People from Scania